Dinas is a station on the narrow gauge Welsh Highland Railway, which was built in 1877 as the North Wales Narrow Gauge Railways Moel Tryfan Undertaking to carry dressed slate for trans-shipment to the LNWR. Passenger services ceased on 26 September 1936 until which time Dinas had been a joint station, known as Dinas Junction with the LNWR and later the LMS. In 1951, British Railways closed their part of the station but the line through the station remained open until the line from Caernarvon to Afon Wen was closed in 1964. The trackbed was subsequently developed as the Lôn Eifion tourist cycle route.

The official opening for the completed line was 20 April 2011. The train services are operated by the Festiniog Railway Company by its Welsh Highland Railway subsidiary.

At Dinas, the new narrow gauge platforms are built on the site of the former standard gauge platforms. Two buildings survive from the North Wales Narrow Gauge Railways era, namely the former goods shed and the original station building which has been carefully restored. Dinas station yards house the Welsh Highland Railway offices, carriage sheds and locomotive depot as well as extensive civil engineering works and sidings.

References

Sources

Further material

External links
The Welsh Highland Railway Project Official reconstruction site
Welsh Highland Railway (Caernarfon) The railway itself
Rebuilding The Welsh Highland Railway An independent site
Welsh Highland Railway Timetables The railway itself
By DMU from Pwllheli to Amlwch Huntley Archives

Heritage railway stations in Gwynedd
Welsh Highland Railway
Railway depots in Wales
Llanwnda, Gwynedd
Railway stations in Great Britain opened in 1877
Railway stations in Great Britain closed in 1951
Railway stations in Great Britain opened in 1997
Former London and North Western Railway stations